Taint was a three-piece heavy metal band from Swansea, Wales.

History
The band was formed in 1994 by guitarist and singer James "Jimbob" Isaac, bassist Darren Mason, and drummer Alex Harries, when they were all still teen-agers. In 2000, they released their first EP, Die Die Truthspeaker. By this time, the bassist Stophe Thomas had replaced Mason; Thomas left in 2001 and was replaced by Chris West.

In 2005, they released their first album, The Ruin of Nová Roma. Their second release, Secrets and Lies, followed in 2007, with an EP, All Bees to the Sea, following in 2009.

In September 2010, Taint announced via their website that they were disbanding. The band had always toured extensively; now Harries and West wanted to stop touring and spend more time with their families and Isaac wanted to keep touring and writing. They played their final show in December 2010 in their hometown of Swansea. In 2019, Taint was included in the exhibit and documentary 50 Years of Music in Swansea.

Jimbob Isaac formed the three-piece band 'Hark'. and Chris West joined the band Spider Kitten.

Discography

References

External links
 Taint Official Website

Sludge metal musical groups
Welsh stoner rock musical groups
Welsh heavy metal musical groups
British musical trios
Musical groups established in 1994
1994 establishments in Wales